ISO 13567 is an international computer-aided design (CAD) layer standard.

Standard parts
The standard is divided into three parts:
ISO 13567-1:2017
Technical product documentation — Organization and naming of layers for CAD — Part 1: Overview and principles
ISO 13567-2:2017
Technical product documentation — Organization and naming of layers for CAD — Part 2: Concepts, format and codes used in construction documentation
ISO/TR 13567-3:1999 (withdrawn September 2015)
Technical product documentation — Organization and naming of layers for CAD — Part 3: Application of ISO 13567-1 and ISO 13567-2

Standard has been developed by Technical Committee TC 10 (Technical product documentation) Subcommittee SC 8 (Construction documentation); Refer. ICS: 01.110; 35.240.10.

Structure of layer names
CAD layer names are structured as a series of mandatory and optional fixed length fields, composed as a continuous alpha-numerical text string.

Mandatory fields
Agent responsible (clause 6.1)
(2 characters, indicating the person or organisation responsible for the layer information—manufacturer,
 A- architect
 A2 architect#2 on the same project
 B- building surveyors
 C- civil engineers
 E- electrical engineers
 F- facility engineers
 G- GIS engineers and land surveyors
 H- heating and ventilating engineers
 I- interior designers
 L- landscape architects
 Q- quantity surveyors
 S- structural engineers
 T- town and country planners
 W- contractors
 X- sub-contractors
 Y- specialist designers

Element (clause 6.2)
(6 characters, indicating the functional parts of construction works or structure): follows a classification system like SfB building codes or Uniclass codes;

Presentation (clause 6.3)
(2 characters, related to the information graphical presentation)
 -- whole model and drawing page,
 E- element graphics (Model space)
 T- text (M)
 H- hatching (M)
 D- dimensions (M)
 J- section/detail marks (M)
 K- revision marks (M)
 G- Grid graphic and dimension (M)
 U- user red lines & construction lines (M)
 B- Border (Page/Paper space)
 V- text, title, notes (P)
 I- tabular information, legends, schedules, tables/query (P)
 -1 language#1 or pen thickness#1 or text height#1

Optional fields
Status (clause 7.1)
(1 character, status of the physical part, ISO code)
 - whole, no subdivision
 N new part
 E existing to remain
 R to be removed
 T temporary
 O to be moved original position
 F to be moved final position

Sector (clause 7.2)
(4 characters, physical subdivision of construction work, recommended to use ISO 4157-2/3 codes)
 ---- whole project, all levels all blocks
 00—ground floor
 02–2nd floor
 -1-- basement
 SA—section AA
 EA—elevation A
 EB—elevation B
 --B1 block 1
 --A- zone A
 01B1 1st floor block#1
 -2-- 2nd basement level
 01A- storey 01 zone A

Phase (clause 7.3)
(1 character, time or logical subdivision of work)
 - whole duration
 P pre-design/preliminary
 D design
 R procurement
 C construction
 O post-construction
 1 phase#1 (pre-design)
 2 phase#2
 3 phase#3 (licence design)

Projection (clause 7.4)
(1 character, work multiple views differentiation, ISO code)
 - all
 0 plan
 1 elevation
 2 section
 3 3D model

Scale (clause 7.5)
(1 character, classification of layer information by the scale of final drawing, ISO code)
 - all
 A 1:1
 B 1:5
 C 1:10
 D 1:20
 E 1:50
 F 1:100
 G 1:200
 H 1:500
 I 1:1000
 J 1:2000
 K 1:5000
 1 1:1-5
 2 1:5-20
 3 1:20-50
 4 1:50-100
 5 1:100-200
 6 1:200-500
 7 1:500-1000

Work Package (clause 7.6)
(2 characters, materials and/or work sections)
 RC reinforced concrete
 SS structural steel
 23 phase#23

User Defined (clause 7.7)
(unlimited, additional subdivision or help plain description): description or subdivision.

Special characters

 - (hyphenation)Used for all possible values of a specific character position. For no further subdivision use the hyphen character 
 _ (underscore) Where a field is not being used or a decision has not been made

Applications

Resulting length
In practice, application of ISO 13567 fields can lead to short names (only mandatory fields), or much longer names (use of some or all optional fields in complex projects).

Short name samples
A-B374—T- agent Architect, element Roof window in SfB, presentation text
A-B374—E- agent Architect, element Roof window in SfB, presentation graphic element
 Other 
A-374---T-
A-24—__D-

Long name samples
A-37420-T2N01B113B23pro agent Architect, element Roof Window in SfB, presentation Text#2, New part, floor 01, block B1, *phase 1, projection 3D, scale 1:5(B), work package 23 and user definition "pro"
A-G25---D-R agent Architect, element wall in Uniclass, presentation dimensions, status Existing to be removed
 Other 
A-2441__D-N01AB1
A-37420-T2N01B113B23pro
T-811---E-N----30F—DESCRIPTION_OF_LAYER
E-63----E-N----30G—ELECTRICAL_EQUIPMENT
A1645---Z-O----1-A72DESCRIPTION_OF_LAYER
A-DUCTS-E-N02C------P281
F-5821ABE-N-I--13C23USER
A-144001M-----

List of layers in a standard architectural drawing
Agent is Architect, using ISO 13567 and Uniclass or CI/SfB Classification System.

Generic layers

 A-------E-: all elements
 A-------T-: text
 A-------H-: hatchings
 A-------D-: dimensions
 A-------J-: section/detail marks
 A-------K-: revision marks
 A-------G-: grid (graphics and dimensions)
 A-------U-: user (red and construction lines)

 A-------B-: border (border lines/frame and other graphics) in paper space
 A-------V-: text (title and notes) in paper space
 A-------I-: tabular information (legends, schedules and tables) in paper space

 A-------E-N: new work elements
 A-------E-E: elements existing to remain 
 A-------E-R: elements existing to be removed

 A-------E1: line thickness 0,13 mm
 A-------E2: line thickness 0,18 mm
 A-------E3: line thickness 0,25 mm
 A-------E4: line thickness 0,35 mm
 A-------E5: line thickness 0,50 mm
 A-------E6: line thickness 0,70 mm

 A-------T1: text height 1,8 mm
 A-------T2: text height 2,5 mm
 A-------T3: text height 3,5 mm
 A-------T4: text height 5,0 mm
 A-------T5: text height 7,0 mm
 A-------T6: text height 10,0 mm

Architectural layers using Uniclass
Uniclass 1.4 now superseded by Uniclass 2015

Using Uniclass Table G and Table H (exceptionally F and J tables).

 A-F1----E-: zones (blocks, wings, floors, departments)
 A-F2----E-: rooms 
 A-F2----T-: room numbers and text
 A-F3----E-: circulation (foyers, halls, stairs, corridors, gangways)
 A-F9----E-: building space analysed (areas)
 A-F911—E-: usable area (ISO 9836)
 A-F912—E-: circulation area (ISO 9836)
 A-F913—E-: services area (ISO 9836)
 A-F914—E-: structural element area (ISO 9836)
 A-F919—E-: gross area (ISO 9836)

 A-G-----E-: building
 A-G11---E-: site clearance
 A-G12---E-: ground contouring
 A-G2----E-: building fabric
 A-G21---E-: foundations
 A-G21---E5: foundations in section
 A-G22---E-: floors, slabs
 A-G22---E5: floors, slabs in section
 A-G23---E-: stairs (incl. balustrades), ramps
 A-G23---E5: stairs and ramps in section
 A-G24---E-: roofs
 A-G24---E5: roofs in section
 A-G25---E-: walls
 A-G25---E5: walls in section
 A-G251—E-: external walls
 A-G252—E-: internal walls
 A-G253—E-: walls retaining
 A-G26---E-: structural frame, columns, beams, bracing
 A-G26---E5: structural frame, columns, beams, bracing in section
 A-G261—E-: beams
 A-G262—E-: columns
 A-G3----E-: fabric: parts of elements
 A-G312—E-: coverings or external finishes
 A-G321—E-: windows
 A-G322—E-: doors
 A-G33---E-: internal finishes (on floor, ceilings, walls)
 A-G331—E-: floor finishes
 A-G332—E-: ceilings/soffit finishes
 A-G333—E-: internal wall finishes
 A-G4----E-: fittings, furnitures, equipments
 A-G44---E-: sanitary fittings
 A-G50---E-: water supply (water pipes)
 A-G501—E-: cold water
 A-G502—E-: hot water
 A-G51---E-: gas supply
 A-G52---E-: heating/ventilation/air conditioning (HVAC) (HVAC ductworks)
 A-G53---E-: electric power (cable runs)
 A-G54---E-: lighting fixtures (fittings)
 A-G55---E-: communications (radio, TV, telephones, computer networks)
 A-G561—E-: lifts
 A-G562—E-: escalators
 A-G57---E-: protection (security, fire)
 A-G581—E-: removal /disposal, drainage
 A-G6----E-: energy (heat, electricity) generation, storage and conversion
 A-G621—E-: tanks  
 A-G7----E-: external site works
 A-G71---E-: surface treatment of external site (hard surfaces, landscaping)
 A-G72---E-: enclosures of external site (fence, walls)
 A-G74---E-: fittings/furnitures/equipment of external site (manholes)
 A-G77---E-: underground drainage in external site (drain runs)

 A-H-----E-: civil engineering works (non-building)
 A-H1----E-: pavements and landscaping (ground, pavements, etc.)
 A-H122—E-: surfacing to pavements and hard landscaping
 A-H123—E-: edgework to pavements and hard landscaping
 A-H132—E-: electrical installations (mechanical, lighting, power, communications)
 A-H142—E-: fittings
 A-H1422-E-: signs
 A-H1424-E-: street furniture
 A-H735—E-: drainage (non building)

 A-JE0---E-: concrete
 A-JF1---E-: block/brick work
 A-JF2---E-: stone
 A-JG1---E-: metal
 A-JG10—E-: structural steel
 A-JG2---E-: timber
 A-JK3---E-: glass

 A-Z1----V-: title sheet
 A-Z22---V-: annotation (in paper space)
 A-Z2211-T-: tags
 A-Z2212-T-: labels
 A-Z2213-T-: references
 A-Z22131T-: room references
 A-Z22132T-: door references
 A-Z22133T-: window references
 A-Z224—I-: legends (in paper space)
 A-Z226—E-: key plan
 A-Z227—E-: barscales
 A-Z228—E-: north point
 A-Z23---D-: dimensions
 A-Z24---H-: hatching
 A-Z241—E-: hatch boundaries
 A-Z31---E-: external reference (Xref)
 A-Z33---I-: tables and schedules
 A-Z34---E-: images
 A-Z41---E-: points
 A-Z42---G-: gridlines
 A-Z5----E-: drawing symbols
 A-Z521—J-: section marks
 A-Z522—J-: break marks
 A-Z524—J-: void and opening markers
 A-Z7----E-: presentation
 A-Z71---E-: vehicles
 A-Z72---E-: people
 A-Z73---E-: trees and planting
 A-Z74---H-: hatching
 A-Z8----U-: read me and non-plotting
 A-Z81---U-: construction lines

Note: Elements cut by section has been provisionally indicated as A-****--E5 (reflecting the use of a wider line). An alternative -but longest- notation could be A-****--E-------2 (defining the view as section) or A-****--ES.

Architectural layers using CI/SfB

 A-100---E-: substructure
 A-110---E-: groundwork
 A-160---E-: foundations
 A-170---E-: pile foundations
 A-210---E-: external walls
 A-214---E-: external curtain walls
 A-220---E-: internal walls
 A-226---E-: internal framing & cladding
 A-230---E-: floors
 A-240---E-: stairs
 A-270---E-: roofs
 A-28----E-: building frames
 A-280---E-: beams and columns
 A-281---E-: metal columns
 A-282---E-: concrete columns
 A-283---E-: metal beams
 A-284---E-: concrete beams
 A-285---E-: timber beams
 A-310---E-: external wall completions
 A-314---E-: external windows
 A-315---E-: external doors
 A-320---E-: internal wall completions
 A-324---E-: internal windows
 A-325---E-: internal doors
 A-330---E-: floor completions
 A-340---E-: stairs
 A-350---E-: ceilings
 A-370---E-: roof completions
 A-374---E-: roof windows
 A-410---E-: external wall finishes
 A-420---E-: internal wall finishes
 A-430---E-: floor finishes
 A-440---E-: stair finishes
 A-450---E-: ceiling finishes
 A-470---E-: roof finishes
 A-5-----E-: services, non electrical
 A-500---E-: mechanical
 A-52----E-: waste disposal, drainage
 A-53----E-: water & liquid supply
 A-54----E-: gas supply
 A-55----E-: space cooling, refrigeration
 A-56----E-: space heating
 A-57----E-: ventilation
 A-59----E-: parts, accessories to piped, ducted services
 A-6-----E-: services, mainly electrical
 A-600---E-: electrical
 A-61----E-: electrical supply
 A-62----E-: power supply
 A-63----E-: lighting
 A-630---E-: lamps
 A-640---E-: communications
 A-65----E-: telecommunications
 A-660---E-: transports
 A-661---E-: lifts
 A-68----E-: security protection
 A-700---E-: general fittings & furniture
 A-71----E-: circulation fitting
 A-72----E-: rest, work fittings 
 A-73----E-: kitchens, culinary fittings
 A-74----E-: sanitary fittings
 A-75----E-: cleaning fittings
 A-76----E-: storage fittings
 A-77----E-: special activity fittings
 A-78----E-: loose fittings
 A-900---E-: external works
 A-910---E-: site information
 A-920---E-: survey information
 A-930---E-: land drainage/services
 A-940---E-: landscaping
 A-950---E-: hard surfaces
 A-960---E-: utilities
 A-970---E-: fences/equipment
 A-980---E-: special landscaping
 A-990---E-: environmental data

See also
CAD standards
Construction Project Information Committee
Uniclass
List of ISO standards

References

External links
The Electronic Journal of Information Technology in Construction
Paper by ITCON in pdf
Another paper by ITCON in pdf

13567
Computer-aided design